In mathematics and signal processing, the advanced z-transform is an extension of the z-transform, to incorporate ideal delays that are not multiples of the sampling time. It takes the form

where
 T is the sampling period
 m (the "delay parameter") is a fraction of the sampling period 

It is also known as the modified z-transform.

The advanced z-transform is widely applied, for example to accurately model processing delays in digital control.

Properties
If the delay parameter, m, is considered fixed then all the properties of the z-transform hold for the advanced z-transform.

Linearity

Time shift

Damping

Time multiplication

Final value theorem

Example
Consider the following example where :

If  then  reduces to the transform

References

Transforms